Shkolny is a rural locality (a settlement) in Vetyutnevskoye Rural Settlement, Frolovsky District, Volgograd Oblast, Russia. The population was 208 as of 2010.

Geography 
Shkolny is located on the Archede River, 20 km west of Prigorodny (the district's administrative centre) by road. Kolobrodov is the nearest rural locality.

References 

Rural localities in Frolovsky District